The Coastal Riverine Force (CORIVFOR) is a unit of the United States Navy within the organizational structure of the Navy Expeditionary Combat Command (NECC). The unit was established following the merger of Riverine Group 1 and the Maritime Expeditionary Security Group 1 & 2 (MESG-1 / MESG 2) on June 1, 2012. Its express purpose is to provide port and harbor security, and offshore protection for maritime infrastructure and Military Sealift Command ships operating in coastal waterways.

Groups
The unit is composed of two Echelon IV groups and one TIER 1 unit (ESIT):
Embarked Security and Intelligence Teams(ESIT) are composed of elite NECC Combatants. The tip of the spear for U.S. 5th Fleet AOR, ESIT's embark on U.S. flagged vessels and provide immediate defense of said units. Only the elite of the CORIVGRU sailors will be deployed in such units. 
Coastal Riverine Group One (CORIVGRU 1), homeported in Imperial Beach, California, with squadrons at: Naval Air Station North Island (CORIVRON 1) and Naval Weapons Station Seal Beach (NWS Seal Beach) (CORIVRON 11); Imperial Beach, California (CORIVRON 3); and Coastal Riverine Group Detachment Guam (CRG-1 DET Guam) in Guam.
Coastal Riverine Group Two (CORIVGRU 2), homeported on Joint Expeditionary Base Little Creek-Fort Story (JEBLC-FS) in Virginia Beach, Virginia, with squadrons located at Joint Expeditionary Base Little Creek-Fort Story (JEBLC-FS), a forward deployed detachment in Bahrain, and reserve squadrons in Norfolk Naval Shipyard, Newport, Rhode Island and Jacksonville, Florida.

History
Patrol Boat teams can trace their history back to World War II. Motor Torpedo Boat Squadron Three rescued General Douglas MacArthur (and later the Filipino president Manuel L. Quezon) from the Philippines after the Japanese invasion and then participated in guerilla actions until American resistance ended with the fall of Corregidor. PT boats subsequently participated in most of the campaigns in the Southwest Pacific by conducting and supporting joint/combined reconnaissance, blockade, sabotage, and raiding missions as well as attacking Japanese shore facilities, shipping, and combatants. PT boats were used in the European Theater beginning in April 1944 to support the Office of Strategic Services in the insertion of espionage and French Resistance personnel and for amphibious landing deception.

The development of a robust riverine warfare capability during the Vietnam War produced the forerunner of the modern special warfare combatant-craft crewman. In 1966 River Patrol Force (Task Force 116) operated River Patrol Boats (PBR) conducting counterinsurgency operations in the Mekong Delta region of Vietnam. A SEAL Platoon was assigned to each of the five River Squadrons inserted and extracted from their patrol area by PBRs. Game Warden forces lost 200 Sailors in the boats from its inception to its discontinuation, however Task Force 116's kill ratio (approximately 40 enemy KIA to every 1 American KIA) was one of the highest of U.S. forces during the Vietnam War. In total, two sailors of Task Force 116 were awarded the Medal of Honor: Petty Officer First Class James Williams and Seaman David George Ouettet. Nevertheless, the VC did not cease operations in the Mekong Delta but instead began focusing on disrupting traffic on the rivers and ultimately redirected their sampans and other watercraft to smaller rivers and canals to avoid combat with the more powerful PBRs.

Personnel and equipment

As of October 2012, the unit had 113 boats, ranging from rubber combat raiding craft to 53-foot command boats. It also had 2,657 active and 2,507 reserve personnel.

References 

Military units and formations of the United States Navy
Riverine warfare